In Greek mythology, Sparta (Doric Greek: Σπάρτα, Spártā; Attic Greek: Σπάρτη, Spártē) was the ancient Queen of Sparta, which was named in her honour.

Family 
Sparta was one of two daughters of King Eurotas of Laconia and Clete, with the other being Tiasa.

By her husband, Lacedaemon, Sparta became the mother of Amyclas and Eurydice, wife of King Acrisius of Argos, and the grandmother of Hyacinthus, who was loved by Apollo and Zephyrus. She was also an ancestor of King Tyndareus of Sparta and his brother Icarius and their children Clytemnestra, Castor and Penelope.

Mythology 
According to traditions recorded by Pausanias, Sparta's father having no male heirs bequeathed his kingdom to Lacedaemon. When he became king, he changed the name of the land and the inhabitants to Lacedaemon and Lacedaemonians, respectively, and he founded the City of Sparta, which was named after his wife.  

Sparta was represented on a sacrificial tripod at Amyclae.

Family tree

Notes

References 

 Apollodorus, The Library with an English Translation by Sir James George Frazer, F.B.A., F.R.S. in 2 Volumes, Cambridge, MA, Harvard University Press; London, William Heinemann Ltd. 1921. ISBN 0-674-99135-4. Online version at the Perseus Digital Library. Greek text available from the same website.
 Pausanias, Description of Greece with an English Translation by W.H.S. Jones, Litt.D., and H.A. Ormerod, M.A., in 4 Volumes. Cambridge, MA, Harvard University Press; London, William Heinemann Ltd. 1918. . Online version at the Perseus Digital Library
 Pausanias, Graeciae Descriptio. 3 vols. Leipzig, Teubner. 1903.  Greek text available at the Perseus Digital Library.

Queens in Greek mythology
Spartan princesses
Princesses in Greek mythology
Rulers of Sparta
Laconian characters in Greek mythology
Laconian mythology